A tax straddle is a strategy used to create a tax shelter.

For example, an investor with a capital gain manipulates investments to create an artificial loss from an unrelated transaction to offset their gain in a current year, and postpone the gain till the following tax year. One position accumulates an unrealized gain, the other a loss. Then the position with the loss is closed prior to the completion of the tax year, countering the gain.  When the new year for tax begins, a replacement position is created to offset the risk from the retained position. Through repeated straddling, gains can be postponed indefinitely over many years.

References

Further reading
Publication 17 Your Federal Income Tax
Form 1040 series of forms and instructions
Social Security's booklet "Medicare Premiums: Rules for Higher-Income Beneficiaries" and the calculation of the Social Security MAGI.

Taxation in the United States
Fiscal policy